The Pacific Coast League Most Valuable Player Award (MVP) is an annual award given to the best player in Minor League Baseball's Pacific Coast League based on their regular-season performance as voted on by league managers. From 1932 to 1947, the award was voted upon by writers from The Sporting News. Broadcasters, Minor League Baseball executives, and members of the media have previously voted as well. Though the league was established in 1903, the award was not created until 1927. No MVP was selected from 1928 to 1931. In 1948, Charlie Graham donated a plaque, which was named in his honor, to be awarded annually to the league's MVP. The award was suspended for six seasons in the 1970s (1973, 1975–1979). After the cancellation of the 2020 season, the league was known as the Triple-A West in 2021 before reverting to the Pacific Coast League name in 2022.

Twenty-nine outfielders have won the MVP Award, the most of any position. First basemen, with 20 winners, have won the most among infielders, followed by third basemen (10) and second basemen and shortstops (4). Eleven pitchers and seven catchers have won the award.

Nine players who have won the MVP Award also won the Pacific Coast League Top MLB Prospect Award (formerly the Rookie of the Year Award) in the same season: Willie Davis (1960), Billy Cowan (1963), Denny Doyle (1969), Robb Quinlan (2002), Adam Eaton (2012), Chris Owings (2013), Joc Pederson (2014), Joshua Fuentes (2018), Ty France (2019). The Pacific Coast League sporadically issued a Pitcher of the Year Award from 1957 to 1974 and continuously since 2001. No pitcher has won both awards. Three players have won the MVP Award on multiple occasions. Steve Bilko, who won for three consecutive years from 1955 to 1957, has the most wins. Sandy Alomar Jr. (1988 and 1989) and Les Scarsella (1944 and 1946) both won the award twice.

Seven players from the Las Vegas Aviators and Los Angeles Angels have each been selected for the MVP Award, more than any other teams in the league, followed by the Albuquerque Dukes and San Diego Padres (6); the Hollywood Stars and Sacramento River Cats (5); the Oakland Oaks, San Francisco Seals, and Spokane Indians (4); the Calgary Cannons, Reno Aces, Seattle Rainiers, and Tucson Sidewinders (3); the Albuquerque Isotopes, Edmonton Trappers, El Paso Chihuahuas, Fresno Grizzlies, Iowa Cubs, Oklahoma City Dodgers, Phoenix Firebirds, Sacramento Solons, Salt Lake City Bees, and Tacoma Rainiers (2); and the Eugene Emeralds, Indianapolis Indians, Omaha Royals, Salt Lake Bees, and Tulsa Oilers (1).

Thirteen players from the Los Angeles Dodgers Major League Baseball (MLB) organization have won the award, more than any other, followed by the Chicago Cubs organization (9); the San Diego Padres and San Francisco Giants organizations (6); the Arizona Diamondbacks, Houston Astros, Oakland Athletics, and Seattle Mariners organizations (4); the Chicago White Sox, Pittsburgh Pirates, and St. Louis Cardinals organizations (3); the Cincinnati Reds, Los Angeles Angels, Philadelphia Phillies, Texas Rangers, and Toronto Blue Jays organizations (2); and the Cleveland Guardians, Colorado Rockies, Kansas City Royals, and New York Yankees organizations (1). Twelve award winners played for teams that were not affiliated with any MLB organization.

Winners

Wins by team

Active Pacific Coast League teams appear in bold.

Wins by organization

Active Pacific Coast League–Major League Baseball affiliations appear in bold.

See also
Major League Baseball Most Valuable Player Award
International League Most Valuable Player Award

References
Specific

General

Awards established in 1927
MVP